Phyllobacterium myrsinacearum is a Gram-negative bacteria from the genus of Phyllobacterium which was isolated from sugar-beet roots. Phyllobacterium rubiacearum differs from Phyllobacterium myrsinacearum in only two nucleotides. Further analysis indicate that Phyllobacterium myrsinacearum and Phyllobacterium rubiacearum should be classified as only species.

References

External links
Type strain of Phyllobacterium myrsinacearum at BacDive -  the Bacterial Diversity Metadatabase

Phyllobacteriaceae
Bacteria described in 1912